Minnesota State Academy for the Blind (MSAB) (formerly known as the Braille and Sight Saving School) is a public school in Faribault, Minnesota, United States. Its mission is the education and life education of blind, visually impaired, and deaf-blind learners from birth to age 21. The school has a residential program and provides 24-hour programming including Braille, independent travel, assistive technologies, and individualized educational services. Students often have multiple disabilities and come from all regions of the state.

The Minnesota Legislature established it in 1866, together with the nearby Minnesota State Academy for the Deaf, which was established three years earlier (1863).

The Minnesota Braille and Talking Book Library is an extension of the Academy for the Blind. It serves people of all ages everywhere in Minnesota with a collection of hundreds of thousands of items. It is funded by the state and federal governments.

Blind Department Building and Dow Hall at the State Academy for the Blind are listed on the National Register of Historic Places. Other facilities include Lysen Hall.

It has dormitory facilities for students.

See also
Minnesota State Academies
Blind Department Building and Dow Hall, State School for the Blind

References

External links

Official Web site
Placeography article on Minnesota State Academy for the Blind (Minnesota Historical Society wiki)
Minnesota Braille and Talking Book Library

Schools for the blind in the United States
Public education in Minnesota
Schools in Rice County, Minnesota
Public high schools in Minnesota
Public elementary schools in Minnesota
Public middle schools in Minnesota
Public K-12 schools in the United States
Buildings and structures in Faribault, Minnesota
Public boarding schools in the United States
Boarding schools in Minnesota